is an original Japanese anime television series animated by Studio Comet, which aired from April 8 to June 24, 2021.

Synopsis
Five young fairies from various clans are chosen by the Fairy Queen and given the mission of heal the afflicted hearts of people and collect the so-called "Attachments", the main resource of their kingdom. In the human world, the group poses as high school students while they work in the mysterious "Bar F". They do not accept any payment, the only price being the heart of their customers.

Characters

Main characters 

Ranmaru is the Fairy of Illumination and is from the Lux Clan. An honest and kind boy, Ranmaru is totally dedicated to his mission of heal the afflicted hearts of people. Likewise, he shows a great disposition to help others, acting numerous times as a mediator between his companions. He suffers from amnesia and his past is a mystery.

Homura is the Fairy of Flames and is from the Ignis Clan. Although hot-tempered, Homura is passionate and caring; however, he tends to clash with Uruu due to the rivalry between the Ignis and Aqua Clans. From a young age, Homura struggles over the death of his father, who was executed.

Uruu is the Fairy of Luster and is from the Aqua Clan. As the Aqua Clan is in charge of political affairs in the fairy world, he has a strict sense of morality and is the most serious in the group. From a young age, he was neglected by his parents and his mother committed suicide after having an extramarital affair with a member from the Ignis Clan, causing him to despise Homura. Uruu eventually discovers that Homura's father was his mother's lover, and he struggles to balance both his hatred for Homura as well as his attraction towards him.

Jyuka is the Fairy of Verdure and is from the Arbor Clan. The youngest of the group, Jyuka has a childish appearance, however, he doesn't like to be considered as someone cute, preferring instead to be seen as someone cool. His main power is healing.

Takara is the Fairy of Gold and is from the Metallum Clan. He is the caretaker of the other fairies and works as a bartender at Bar F. He is the true heir of the Metallum Clan, but, as a child, he and his mother fled from the fairy world after a power struggle started in his clan. After his mother died from starvation, Takara worked as a child prostitute. He is the only fairy in the group who does not abide by the Ten Laws, and he maintains a connection with an ex-fairy lawyer.

Supporting characters 

A mysterious young man whose main objective is to destroy the world of fairies and humans alike. He harbors a strong hate for the Fairy Queen and wishes to see her dead. He also seems to have some kind of connection with Ranmaru's dark past. Later, it's revealed that he is a fallen fairy.

Hōjō is the Fairy of Loam and is from the Earth Clan. He is the loyal assistant of the Fairy Queen. He is a fairy from the Earth Clan and usually takes the appearance of a human.

The queen of the fairy world gives the boys the mission of collect attachments in order to rebuild her kingdom. However, her true intentions remain hidden.

A small  that accompanies the group to Earth and is usually seen with them.

Production and release
On January 8, 2021, the anime original television series was announced through Twitter. The series is animated by Studio Comet and directed by Masakazu Hishida, with Kōsuke Kobayashi as series director, Hishida as scriptwriter under the pseudonym Jō Aoba, and Yamazo composing the series' music. It aired from April 8 to June 24, 2021, on AT-X, Tokyo MX, and BS NTV. Crunchyroll licensed the series outside of South-east Asia. The voice actors for the five main characters performed the opening theme song  and the ending theme song  under the group name 5 to Heaven.

Episode list

Notes

References

External links
Official website 

2021 anime television series debuts
Anime with original screenplays
AT-X (TV network) original programming
Crunchyroll anime